The 2020–21 CEV Cup was the 49th edition of the second most important European volleyball club competition organised by the European Volleyball Confederation.

Participating teams
The number of participants on the basis of ranking list for European Cup Competitions:

Main phase

16th Finals

|}

First leg

|}

Second leg

|}

8th Finals

|}

Group A
 Place:  Moscow

|}

Group B
 Place:  Montpellier

|}

Group C
 Place:  Pazardzhik

|}

Group D
 Place:  Las Palmas

|}

4th Finals

|}

Group A
 Place:  Moscow

|}

Group B
 Place:  Montpellier

|}

Group C
 Place:  Pazardzhik

|}

Group D
 Place:  Las Palmas

|}

Final phase

Semifinals

|}

First leg

|}

Second leg

|}

Finals

|}

First leg

|}

Second leg

|}

Final standings

References

External links
 CEV Volleyball Cup 2021 

CEV Cup
CEV Cup
CEV Cup
Sports events affected by the COVID-19 pandemic